Max Gerald Myer Benjamin Herman (born 2 August 1984) is a British recording artist, composer, songwriter and producer. He has composed, written and produced music for multi-platinum artists, the Royal Philharmonic Orchestra, films and major sport opening ceremonies. Herman's works are notable for integrating piano, electronic sounds, synth percussive sounds, soundscapes and beats with traditional orchestral instruments. Max has produced and wrote hits for various artists at studios such as Abbey Road, Air Studios, Metropolis Studios, Strong Room Studios, Sarm Music Village and Katara Studios (Katara Cultural Village).

Early life
Max was born in Cambridge, United Kingdom.  Max focused on the piano and composition. Max moved to London as a student, where he attended Westminster University. During his time in London, The Royal College of Music invited Herman to compose and to have his work performed by opera singers and instrumentalists at the Britten Theatre Kensington, London.

Live performances
Max began his career in the professional music industry performing on the Piano, Keyboard and Synthesis in 2001, for artists such as Lemar Obika, George Benson, Sam Moore and others. Max can be seen briefly playing the keyboards at The Royal Albert Hall where Lemar performed with George Benson to celebrate his lifetime achievement award.

Max has performed at The Royal Albert Hall, Earls Court Arena and most recently at the Autism Rocks Arena with artist Hamza Hawsawi (X Factor winner) for the opening act of Justin Bieber on his Purpose World Tour 2017.

Film composer
In 2005 film composer Rupert Gregson-Williams was looking for an assistant on the DreamWorks animation Wallace and Gromit: The Curse of the Were-Rabbit and asked Max if he would be interested. Max went on to learn music composition and music production from Rupert Gregson-Williams and Hans Zimmer Since then, Max has scored movies, TV series and advertisements.

Some notable works:

Adidas Y3 Yohji Yamamoto|山本 耀司|Yamamoto Yōji in October 2016 commissioned Max's piece Nuclear Fission for the Y-3 SPORT | The Future of Sportswear A/W16 Campaign. The campaign was released globally.

In May 2017, Max was asked to produce the movie score alongside composer Walter Mair for the feature film 3 Way Junction performed by The Royal Philharmonic Orchestra at Abbey Road Studios

Record producer
As a record producer, Max has collaborated with artists such as; Jay Sean, Karl Wolf, Ennio Morricone, Paloma Faith, The Saturdays, Eternal, VV Brown, Karl Wolf, Carl Douglas, Hamza Hawsawi (The X Factor winner) and others.

Max opened his first commercial recording studio at Metropolis Studios in September 2015 which he co-owned for 8 months until moving to Trevor Horn's Sarm West Studios in July 2016.

Some notable songs include;

 "Yalla Asia" feat Jay Sean, Karl Wolf and Radhika. Yalla Asia was selected as the theme song for the Asian Football Cup in 2011 with over 1,000,000 combined streams in the first week of its release on YouTube and broadcast to a television viewing audience of 484 million in 80 countries across the Asia-Pacific region, Europe, North America and North Africa.
 "Golden Rules" performed by The Saturdays peaked at No. 2 in the UK (Official Charts Company), No. 1 in Scotland (Official Charts Company), No 6 in Europe (European Hot 100 Singles), Number 4 in Ireland (IRMA) as the B-Side to the CD single "Just Cant get Enough" for comic relief. Certified Gold: 284,472 units and sold over 100,000 units in its first week of release.
 "Love a Little" performed by Hamza Hawsawsi as his first single after winning the X Factor.
 "Find You" performed by Hamza Hawsawsi as his third single.

Opening ceremonies and major sporting events
The Grand Opening Ceremony of the King Abdullah Sports City nicknamed the Shining Jewel took place in Saudi Arabia in May 2014. Max composed and produced the music for the spectacle. The ceremony lasted an hour and a half and ended with one of the world's most extravagant firework displays. More than 84,115 diverse fans filled the stadium, over occupying the stadium's capacity of 62,241. It was considered to be one of the greatest sporting events in the history of Saudi Arabia. The ceremony was attended by HH King Abdullah ibn Abdilazīz, along with Crown Prince Salman bin Abdulaziz Al Saud and The Crown Prince Muqrin bin Abdulaziz Al Saud.

"Yalla Asia" The Asian Football Confederation, Doha/Qatar.
For marketing of the event, the organisers opted for the slogan "Yalla Asia" with a song sung by international artists.

Select discography

Charity
For charitable organisations Max composed the music for The Hunting Moon a fund raising internet viral for the charities Malaria No More and The Bill and Melinda Gates Foundation, filmed by Director Robert Samuels.

Mark One Group and the UK-based charity Help Harry Help Others asked Max to compose "Harry's Theme", the true story about a young boy named Harry Moseley and how he laid the foundations for his charity Help Harry Help Others. Consequently, the charity has now raised over £650,000 for brain cancer research.

References

1984 births
Living people